is a railway station on the Chikuhō Main Line operated by JR Kyushu in Iizuka, Fukuoka, Fukuoka Prefecture, Japan.

Lines

Station layout 
The station consists of two staggered side platforms serving two tracks. A station building of modern concrete design houses a waiting room and automatic ticket vending machines. There is a ramp up to the station building entrance from the access road but access to the opposite side platform is by means of a sheltered footbridge.

Adjacent stations

History 
On 1 October 1897, the Chikuho Kogyo Railway, now renamed the Chikuho Railway, merged with the Kyushu Railway. Kyushu Railway undertook the next phase of expansion by extending the track to Keisen, then named Nagao, and establishing it as the new southern terminus on 12 December 1901. Tento was opened on the same day as an intermediate station on this new stretch of track. After the Kyushu Railway was nationalized on 1 July 1907, Japanese Government Railways (JGR) took over control of the station. On 12 October 1909, the track to Iizuka was designated the Chikuho Main Line while the track from Iizuka to Nagao was designated the Nagao Line. On 7 December 1929, both lines were merged and the station became part of the Chikuho Main Line. With the privatization of Japanese National Railways (JNR), the successor of JGR, on 1 April 1987, control of the station passed to JR Kyushu.

Passenger statistics
In fiscal 2016, the station was used by an average of 537 passengers daily (boarding passengers only), and it ranked 237th among the busiest stations of JR Kyushu.

References

External links
Tentō Station (JR Kyushu)

Railway stations in Fukuoka Prefecture
Railway stations in Japan opened in 1901